County Road 350 is a  road in the municipality of Heim in Trøndelag county, Norway.

The road branches off from European route E39 at the Åsletten farm in Halsa and runs a short distance north to Halsa Church, and then north-northeast until it nears Klevset on the shore of Skålvik Fjord. There it turns north-northwest and passes through Rabben and Setra before terminating at Korneset on the shore of Vinje Fjord, where a local road continues, circling around the Halsa Peninsula and eventually leading back to Halsa.

The county road and the smaller local road are also both named Halsavegen (Halsa Road).

References

External links
Statens vegvesen – trafikkmeldinger Fv350 (Traffic Information: County Road 350)

350
Heim, Norway